As'ad AbuKhalil (born 16 March 1960) is a Lebanese-American professor of political science at California State University, Stanislaus.

AbuKhalil is the author of Historical Dictionary of Lebanon (1998), Bin Laden, Islam & America's New "War on Terrorism" (2002), and The Battle for Saudi Arabia (2004).

Biography
AbuKhalil is a professor at California State University, Stanislaus, and was briefly a visiting professor at UC Berkeley.

Political views
AbuKhalil describes himself as "a former Marxist–Leninist who is now an anarchist".

He is an opponent of the Iraq War. He is sharply critical of United States foreign policy, and denounces the corruption of Fatah and the "vulgar anti-Jewish references” made by Hamas, but sees "Israeli terrorism" as a far greater problem in scale and magnitude. He also criticises Iran, Saudi Arabia, and all rival factions in Lebanon including the Shia Hezbollah.

Israel/Palestine
He opposes the state of Israel, stating that "Justice and freedom for the Palestinians are incompatible with the existence of the state of Israel". Some opponents to BDS, among them Prime Minister of Israel Benjamin Netanyahu, have cited a part from AbuKhalil's article published in Al Akhbar where he wrote: "Finkelstein rightly asks whether the real aim of BDS is to bring down the state of Israel. Here, I agree with him that it is. That should be stated as an unambiguous goal. There should not be any equivocation on the subject" in their campaigns against the movement. In response, Abu Khalil wrote on his personal blog that it represented his personal position of what the goals of BDS should be, and that it was being purposefully distorted to stigmatize the movement.

He criticizes the influence of the Israel lobby in the United States. In a televised debate which aired on Al Jazeera on February 23, 2010 (as translated by MEMRI), AbuKhalil stated that US President Barack Obama "has given free rein to the Zionist lobby to do whatever it likes, both in terms of foreign policy and domestic policy." AbuKhalil also stated that "The Zionists want to muzzle us, so that we won't oppose the wars, violence, or hatred of Israel." In the same interview, Abukhalil sharply criticized MEMRI, stating that it is "a rude, propaganda-spreading organization ... which was established by a former Israeli intelligence official" (alluding to MEMRI founder, Yigal Carmon).

Lebanon
In an interview on New TV on January 13, 2010, AbuKhalil stated that "Lebanese nationalism – just like Zionism – was founded on racism and contempt for others – whether for Lebanese of other sects or for other Arabs. ... The Lebanese people, with all its sects, has never proven that it wants, or is capable of, true coexistence. Coexistence in Lebanon is coexistence in blood, conflict, and civil strife."

News media
In an interview which aired on Al Jazeera on October 25, 2011 (as translated by MEMRI), AbuKhalil accused the network of bias and accuses it of giving preferential treatment of "American Propaganda Officials."

The Angry Arab News Service

AbuKhalil's blog, the Angry Arab News Service, was launched in September 2003. The name of the blog is taken from a phrase used by a TV producer to describe AbuKhalil's perspective.

According to the Los Angeles Times, the blog is "known for its sarcastic but knowledgeable commentary", and "stands out for its sense of humor in the dour left-wing landscape." Ken Silverstein writes that the blog often becomes "a furious stream of consciousness that lacks paragraph breaks or other typographic niceties" (though AbuKhalil is nevertheless "a terrific writer and an insightful political analyst").

Commenting on his own coverage of the Syrian Civil War, journalist Glenn Greenwald said "I've often cited As'ad AbuKhalil as a great source on all matters Middle East and – without adopting all or even most of what he has said – he covers Syria almost every day and does it very well."

Books 
Historical Dictionary of Lebanon (1998), 
Bin Laden, Islam & America's New "War on Terrorism" (2002), 
The Battle For Saudi Arabia: Royalty, Fundamentalism, and Global Power (2004),

Articles 
The (Unrecognized) US Contribution to Bloodshed in Syria, by As'ad AbuKhalil, April 29, 2018, consortiumnews.com
The (Unrecognized) US Contribution to Bloodshed in Syria, Part Two, by As'ad AbuKhalil, May 15, 2018, consortiumnews.com

References

External links 

 The Angry Arab News Service
 Articles in Consortiumnews
 Interview in Ceasefire Magazine
Profile in the Los Angeles Times
Profile in Harper's by Ken Silverstein
Debate with Irshad Manji, Muslim feminist/reformist/Zionist, on the Jyllands-Posten Muhammad cartoon controversy
Interview on Democracy Now with Amy Goodman on the July 2006 Israeli invasion of Lebanon – 26:30 into the broadcast
Interview on Electronic Intifada
Slideshow on Flickr
As'ad Abu Khalil - The United States and the Arab Revolt, Feb. 25, 2012, presentation at conference "The Arab Spring: A Year that Changed the World", held at Portland State University in Portland, Oregon.

1960 births
Living people
American atheists
American male bloggers
American bloggers
American political commentators
American feminists
American political scientists
Anti-Zionism in the United States
Atheist feminists
California State University, Stanislaus faculty
Former Marxists
Former Muslims turned agnostics or atheists
Lebanese academics
Lebanese atheists
Lebanese bloggers
Lebanese emigrants to the United States
Lebanese left-wing activists
Lebanese secularists
Lebanese socialists
Lebanese feminists
Male feminists
Middle Eastern studies in the United States
Non-interventionism
People from Tyre, Lebanon